The Tempest is the tenth studio album by American hip hop duo Insane Clown Posse. Released in 2007, the album marks the return of producer Mike E. Clark, who had a falling-out with the duo in 2000. However, he did not collaborate directly with ICP, and would not do so until their 2009 album Bang! Pow! Boom!

The album's concept compares a violent storm to a roller coaster; its lyrical themes vary from horrorcore-based character deconstructions and songs about the supernatural to humorous and lighter subject matter. Clark's production was praised by critics, and the album peaked at number 20 on the Billboard 200. It is the group's 23rd overall release.

History 

Mike E. Clark produced much of Insane Clown Posse's discography, as well as working with other groups on Psychopathic Records, until having a falling-out with ICP in 2000, after completing ICP's album's Bizaar and Bizzar, and beginning production on the Dark Lotus debut album Tales from the Lotus Pod.

After becoming a full-time producer for Kid Rock, Clark contracted pneumonia, but ignored the illness, and began coughing severely as he awoke, leading to a three-month stay in Mount Clemens General Hospital, during which one of his lungs collapsed three times. As the result of his near-death experience, Clark decided to reconcile with Bruce and Utsler. Phone conversations between Clark and Insane Clown Posse led to Clark producing Shaggy 2 Dope's 2006 solo album F.T.F.O.. The following year, Clark produced The Tempest; however, in both instances, he did not work with Psychopathic Records directly. Because of this, ICP felt that The Tempest was missing the collaborative element that they felt made their earlier albums enjoyable. Clark would not work directly work with Psychopathic Records until 2009's Bang! Pow! Boom!

Music and lyrics 

Unlike previous Insane Clown Posse albums, The Tempest is not connected to the Dark Carnival mythology, which formed the basis for ICP's "Joker's Cards" series, which began in 1992 with Carnival of Carnage and concluded with the albums The Wraith: Shangri-La and Hell's Pit; however, it references themes, concepts and songs from previous albums. Joseph Bruce (Violent J) said that The Tempest is a concept album in its own right. Bruce describes the album's concept as relating to both a violent storm which turns into a tornado and pulls people into a hurricane as well as a roller coaster. According to Bruce, "That's a lot like riding on a violent roller coaster, I'd assume. You get jerked to the left, jerked to the right, sucked way up into the sky, and then you go shooting down to the floor, and then you jerk up to the left and then you whip around to the right. Well, The Tempest is a storm in the form of a roller coaster." As a result of this concept, the album focuses on a variety of different moods.

The Tempest maintains much of the horrorcore lyrical content ICP is known for, as well as their humorous perspective. Unlike previous albums, this album does not contain any disses aimed at other rappers or music industry figures. Bruce and Joseph Utsler (Shaggy 2 Dope)'s rapping on this album is described by AllMusic reviewer David Jeffries as being delivered in "a carnival barker fashion that fits with their circus motif", and contrasted Bruce and Utsler themselves as being like "Alice Cooper with a mallrat attitude".

The lyrics of "Growing Again", which describe Violent J growing into a giant, were inspired by Bruce's weight gain; Bruce also says that the song reflects the feeling of being able to "rap about anything we want [...] I feel we have the right for some songs to be softer and not about killing or Dark Carnival." "The Tower" describes a war veteran and expert marksman climbing a college tower and shooting people with an arsenal of weapons, a reference to Charles Whitman's 1966 murder spree.

Mike E. Clark's production incorporates elements of rock and heavy metal, as well as live instrumentation. Reviewer Lana Cooper of PopMatters compares "Ride the Tempest" to A Flock of Seagulls, and describes the instrumentation as incorporating elements of synthesizers and calliope. Cooper says that "Growing Again" incorporates power ballad chords. Jeffries describes "I Do This!" as being influenced by psychedelia, and called "Mexico City" "Low Rider music".

Release and reception 

The album was released with a bonus poster. The Tempest debuted at number 20 on the U.S. Billboard 200, selling about 33,000 copies in its first week. Reviews from AllMusic and PopMatters generally appraised Mike E. Clark's production as the album's most appealing element. AllMusic's David Jeffries wrote, "there's no denying that Clark's vision does wonders for the duo." PopMatters Lana Cooper said that "[Insane Clown Posse's] theatrics have to be given their due." The Tempest was released on vinyl on February 14, 2020.

Track listing

Charts and certifications

Weekly charts

Year-end charts

Personnel 
 Joseph Bruce – vocals, composer
 Shaggy 2 Dope — vocals, scratching
 Mike E. Clark – composer, engineer, mixing, producer, programming
 Jeffrey Campo – mastering
 Brian Debler – artwork, cover design
 DJ Clay — scratching, vocals
 Insane Clown Posse — composer, vocals
 James Mitchell — vocals
 The R.O.C. — vocals, background vocals
 Razor Ray — guitar, soloist, vocals, background vocals
 Michael Scotta — artwork, cover design
 Cindy Wulkan — artwork, cover design

References

2007 albums
Albums produced by Mike E. Clark
Concept albums
Horrorcore albums
Insane Clown Posse albums
Psychopathic Records albums